The discography of Iron Maiden, an English heavy metal band founded in 1975 by bassist Steve Harris, includes seventeen studio albums, as well as numerous live albums, compilations, EPs, singles, video albums, music videos, and box sets. After several personnel changes, they released their self-titled debut album in 1980 with vocalist Paul Di'Anno, guitarists Dave Murray and Dennis Stratton, and drummer Clive Burr, quickly becoming one of the leading proponents of the new wave of British heavy metal movement.

Guitarist Adrian Smith replaced Stratton, and Killers was released in 1981. Later that year, vocalist Bruce Dickinson replaced Paul Di'Anno, marking the beginning of a series of top-ten high-impact releases. They issued The Number of the Beast, becoming the band's first release to top the UK charts, and received a platinum certification by the Recording Industry Association of America. Drummer Nicko McBrain replaced Clive Burr, and the band released Piece of Mind in 1983, followed by Powerslave (1984). Iron Maiden broadened their sound with the use of guitar synthesisers in Somewhere in Time (1986). Their following concept album, Seventh Son of a Seventh Son, was released in 1988, and also topped the UK charts.

The line-up remained unchanged until Adrian Smith left the band during the pre-production stage of their last gold-certified album in the US, No Prayer for the Dying (1990); he was replaced by Janick Gers. Their next UK No. 1 album, Fear of the Dark, was released in 1992, after which Dickinson left the band in the following year. His replacement, Blaze Bayley, debuted in 1995 with The X Factor, an album that marked a decline in the band's career. The diminished fan interest in 1998 with Virtual XI prompted Bayley's departure.

Dickinson and Smith returned to the band in 1999, and a new album, Brave New World, was issued in 2000. Three years later, Dance of Death was released. In 2006 they released A Matter of Life and Death, which received, along with their two previous studio releases, a gold certification by the BPI. In 2010, Iron Maiden issued The Final Frontier, which was positively received by critics, and debuted at No. 1 in over twenty-eight countries, including the United Kingdom. Their sixteenth studio effort, The Book of Souls, was released on 4 September 2015 and became their fifth UK No. 1 album. Iron Maiden are considered one of the most influential and successful heavy metal bands in history, with The Sunday Times reporting in 2017 that the band have sold well over 100 million copies of their albums worldwide, despite little radio or television support. As of 2023 Iron Maiden have sold over 130 mln copies of their albums worldwide. According to MD Daily Record all audio-visual catalogue of the band has sold in over 200 million copies worldwide, including regular albums, singles, VHS’, DVDs and all compilations. By 2022 their releases have been certified silver, gold and platinum around 600 times worldwide.

Albums

Studio albums

Live albums

Compilation albums

Singles

 E Appeared in the Swedish Albums Chart due to length.

Extended plays

Box sets

Videography

Video albums

Music videos

Notes

References

External links

 Iron Maiden's official website
 

Heavy metal group discographies
Discographies of British artists
Discography